Ilfracombe Lifeboat Station is the base for Royal National Lifeboat Institution (RNLI) search and rescue operations at Ilfracombe, Devon in the United Kingdom. The first lifeboat was stationed in the town in 1828 and the present station was opened in 1996. For 29 years a second boat was operated from Morte Bay at Woolacombe. It operates a  all-weather lifeboat (ALB), operational number 13-09 and named The Barry and Peggy High Foundation, Ilfracombe also operates a  inshore lifeboat (ILB), under the operational number D-717 and named the Deborah Brown ll.

History
A pilot boat was fitted out as a lifeboat for the town in 1828, and a new lifeboat was bought by local people in 1850 which operated from a boat house in Hiern's Lane near the harbour. The RNLI started its service in Ilfracombe in 1866 when a boat house was built near the pier at the bottom of Lantern Hill with a slipway nearby. Alterations to the pier in 1871 meant that the slipway was lost and the boat then had to be taken along the road to the harbour whenever it needed to be launched. This boat house was used until 1996 when it was replaced by a new facility near the slipway at the harbour.

When the lifeboat was needed west of Morte Point a crew came out from Ilfracombe on a carriage. It proved difficult to launch into strong winds blowing onto its west-facing beach and so the station was closed in May 1900. The lifeboat was transferred up the coast to Watchet; the boat house has since been incorporated into a café known as the Boat House Café.

The first motor lifeboat at Ilfracombe was placed on station in March 1936. This was a   lifeboat, a type that was designed for work close inshore. It was replaced by a more conventional   boat in 1945, which allowed the Surf boat to be sent to the Netherlands where there was an acute shortage of lifeboats at the end of World War II. The all-weather boat has been supported by an inflatable inshore rescue boat since 1991.

Service awards
The volunteer crews of the RNLI do not expect reward or recognition for their work, but the records include many rescues that have been recognised by letters, certificates and medals from the RNLI management. This list is just some of the most notable.

On 13 November 1949 the Richard Silver Oliver was launched to assist the SS Monte Gurugu which had lost sinking near Morte Point after losing her rudder in a severe storm. After pulling the casualty clear of the shore, the lifeboat took the 23 crew aboard and safely back to Ilfracombe. Coxswain Cecil Irwin was awarded an RNLI silver medal for his work.

In a Force 8 gale on 9 September 1984, the Liberty was dragging her anchor just  from the shore when the Lloyds II reached her. The lifeboat's crew managed to get a line secured to the yacht and towed her into the harbour. A bronze medal was awarded to Coxswain David Clemence for his courage, leadership and seamanship.

Area of operation

Current lifeboats

  13-09 The Barry and Peggy High Foundation
 IB1 D-717 Deborah Brown II which is launched and recovered using Talus MB-H amphibious launch tractor (T-92)

Former lifeboats
'ON' is the RNLI's sequential Official Number; 'Op. No.' is the operational number painted onto the boat.

Pulling and sailing lifeboats

Motor lifeboats

Inshore lifeboats

Notes

See also

 List of RNLI stations

References

External links
 Official station website
 RNLI station information

Lifeboat stations in Devon
Ilfracombe
Buildings and structures in Ilfracombe